Isola Dovarese is a comune (municipality) in the Province of Cremona in the Italian region Lombardy, located about  southeast of Milan and about  east of Cremona.

Isola Dovarese borders the following municipalities: Canneto sull'Oglio, Casalromano, Drizzona, Pessina Cremonese, Torre de' Picenardi, Volongo.

Twin towns
Isola Dovarese is twinned with:
	
  Velaux, France

References

External links
 Official website

Cities and towns in Lombardy